Whimsical (foaled 1903 at Catesby Woodford's Raceland Farm near Paris, Kentucky) was an American Thoroughbred racehorse. She is best known as the second filly to ever win the Preakness Stakes.

Background
Whimsical was sired by Orlando, out of the mare, Kismet, who was sired by United States Racing Hall of Fame stallion, Hindoo.

Racing career
As a two-year-old Whimsical won the Belles Stakes and Golden Rod Stakes at Sheepshead Bay and finished second when racing against colts in the Champagne Stakes. At age three she won the Standard Stakes at Gravesend in which she defeated 1905 Preakness Stakes winner Cairngorm and 1905 Futurity Stakes winner Ormondale. In the Preakness Stakes she led from the start and won easily in a time of 1:45 by 4 lengths over Content and Larabie. In this period, the race was held at Gravesend Race Track on Coney Island, New York.

Owner Tim Gaynor sold Whimsical to the partnership of Matthew Looram and a Mr. Biddle. The new owners maintained Gaynor as Whimsical's trainer until late August 1907 when they replaced him with Frank Weir.

Retirement
Whimsical was retired to Brookdale Farm to become a broodmare.

Honours
The Whimsical Stakes at Pimlico Race Course is a 6 furlong race named for her and is raced on Preakness weekend.

Pedigree

References 

1903 racehorse births
Racehorses bred in Kentucky
Racehorses trained in the United States
Preakness Stakes winners
Thoroughbred family 2-n